Dan McCullough (born April 17, 1983) is a former Canadian football long snapper for the BC Lions of the Canadian Football League and the former head coach for the UNB Red Bombers of the Atlantic Football League. He was signed as an undrafted free agent by the Lions in 2007. He played CIS football with Bishop's University. He retired on March 9, 2012, in order to pursue business interests.

References

External links
Just Sports Stats
Dan's Official Website: Maritime Tough

1983 births
BC Lions players
Bishop's Gaiters football players
Canadian football long snappers
Living people
Players of Canadian football from New Brunswick
Sportspeople from Fredericton
U Sports football coaches